John Lewis Childs (May 13, 1856 – March 6, 1921) was a horticultural businessman and politician who founded Floral Park, New York. In addition to a widespread reputation for being a zealous ornithologist, Childs is also credited with founding the first mail order seed catalog business in the United States.

About
Childs was born in Franklin County, Maine, and grew up in Buckfield. His career in horticulture began in 1874, when he took a job with C. L. Allen of Queens. Soon afterwards he began renting, then buying land in nearby East Hinsdale, Queens County, near other
nurseries.

Business
Within five years of building his own seed and bulb business and starting America's first seed catalog business, Childs established a bustling business. The volume of his business is attributed with the expansion of the Floral Park Post Office and nearby village businesses. Additionally, Childs was responsible for building more than 20 buildings in Floral Park, including hotels, lumber mills and his own printing press. He also provided a public park for the community, built the first school in town, and served as the first village president, which later became the office of mayor.

Politics
He was a Republican member of the New York State Senate (1st D.) in 1894 and 1895, and during his term he ferried a bill establishing a State Normal School in nearby Jamaica. He ran twice unsuccessfully for a seat in the U.S. Congress.

Land holdings
Childs bought a great deal of land in the area around Floral Park. His extensive land holdings related mainly to his seed catalog business, with more than  used for that purpose near St. James, New York and eastern Long Island. Today, "Flowerfields" is an area within St. James that was founded by Childs around 1909.

Ornithology
Childs was an elected member of the American Ornithological Union and maintained one of the largest private ornithology libraries in the United States. He possessed the largest privately held collection of over 1,100 mounted North American birds, most with nest and eggs. He personally collected more than 700 specimens of this collection. He was also a friend of John Burroughs, who contributed articles on birds to Childs’ magazine, The Warbler. Childs published the journal from 1906 to 1913.

Death
Childs died aboard a New York Central train from Albany to New York City in 1921. His company continued to operate in the 1920s, only stopping in the Great Depression. His wife sold the seed catalog operation to the Edward T. Bromfield Seed Company in the mid-1920s. Childs’ realty holdings were sold in the mid-1930s, valued by the broker at $2,000,000. Childs's ornate 18 room Victorian house in Floral Park was torn down in 1950.

References

External links
 Historic photo of Childs
 Historic photos of Childs' property and donations
 
 

1856 births
1921 deaths
People from Jay, Maine
People from Floral Park, New York
American horticulture businesspeople
American ornithologists
Republican Party New York (state) state senators
People from St. James, New York
People from Buckfield, Maine
Scientists from New York (state)